Outschool, Inc. is an American online marketplace of virtual classes for children. It is headquartered in San Francisco, California.

History 
Outschool was co-founded in 2015 by Amir Nathoo, alongside former Google employee Mikhail Seregine and Nick Grandy, an engineer working for Airbnb.

Using seed money from startup accelerator Y Combinator, Nathoo and company created the platform's website in 2016; the first class was released shortly after in 2017.

In September 2020, Outschool raised $45 million in a round of Series B funding led by Lightspeed. This was followed in April 2021 by $75 million of Series C funding, causing the company to become a unicorn valued at $1.3 billion. In October 2021, the firm raised $110M in Series D funding led by Tiger Global Management, which brought its valuation to $3 billion.

References 

Online marketplaces of the United States
Educational websites